Monarch was launched at Whitby in 1810. In 1803 her owners sold her to the Montrose Whale Fishing Company. Between 1813 and 1839 she made 27 annual voyages to the northern whale fishery. Her most successful years were 1823 when she killed 28 whales and brought in 193 tuns of whale oil, and 1832 when she killed 24 whales and brought in 205 tuns of whale oil. She was last listed in 1838. However, she was sold in 1839 and still sailing to the Baltic for some time.

Career
Monarch first appeared in the Register of Shipping in the volume for 1810.

Initially Monarch sailed as a coaster between Whitby and Shields. Then in 1813 her owners sold her to Montrose, and she assumed Montrose Registry.

The French Revolutionary (1793–1802) and  Napoleonic (1803–1814) Wars resulted in a reduction in whaling as sailors were diverted to the navy, causing a rise in wages for those still in whaling and mercantile trade. Owners of whalers had to compete with the Navy for stores, and the whalers came to carry guns to protect themselves from privateers.

Towards the end of the Napoleonic Wars, oil prices started to rise more sharply than costs. The whale fishery was also more productive as the reduced activity earlier had helped stocks of whales improve. Consequently,the number of whalers and whaling from Scotland started to increase.

As a whaler, Monarch carried six to seven whaleboats, which did the actual whaling. The ship was a means for getting the boats and their crews to the whaling grounds, and their catch home. By law, each whaler had to carry one boat and six-man crew for every 50 tons burthen. In all, Monarch carried 46–50 men.

The whaling data below is primarily from the Scottish Arctic Whaling Voyages database, augmented with reports from Lloyd's List and other contemporary newspaper sources. When there are two numbers for whales or tuns in a cell, the second is from Jackson.

The Montrose Whaling Company went into voluntary liquidation on November 1833. Her owners were unable to find buyers for their two ships or their boiling houses. Cheap oil was coming from the British southern whale fishery. Also, the arrival of Free Trade ended penal tariffs on foreign oil.

The company's manager, James Guthrie, continued to dispatch Eliza Swan and Monarch to Davis Strait, but catches were poor. In 1836 Monarch came home a "clean ship", having failed to catch anything.

The whaling data below is primarily from the Scottish Arctic Whaling Voyages database, augmented with reports from Lloyd's List and other contemporary newspaper sources. When there are two numbers for whales or tuns in a cell, the second is from Jackson.

Fate
Monarch was last listed in 1838. Whaling was in decline in Scotland. (In Whitby, the last whaling voyage took place in 1837.) 

In 1839, the shipbuilder Charles Birnie finally purchased the Montrose Whaling Company's assets. He advertised the yard for sale and put the two vessels into the Baltic trade. Monarch went back to being a merchantman, carrying flax and other cargoes.

Citations

References
 
 

1810 ships
Ships built in Whitby
Age of Sail merchant ships of England
Whaling ships